Georg Thomas (20 February 1890 – 29 December 1946) was a German general in the Third Reich. He was a leading participant in planning and carrying out economic exploitation of the Soviet Union, most notably the Hunger Plan. Thomas's role in plotting against Hitler has led some historians to describe him as a member of the German resistance, while others find his record more ambiguous.

Career summary 
Thomas was born in Forst (Lausitz), Brandenburg. The factory owner's son and later general joined Infantry Regiment 63 as an ensign and a career soldier in 1908. From 1928, he dealt with armament questions at the Army Weapons Office in the Reich Defence Ministry in Berlin. Thomas continued to work as the Chief of Staff for the Army Weapons Office in the Reich Defence Ministry from 1928-1938, where he intensively studied the dynamic of national economics and war preparations, pushing forward the idea of a "defense economy" - that is, the marshaling of Germany's resources for the purpose of war under a central planning commission. Despite his misgivings with National Socialism following the dismissal of Colonel General Baron Werner von Fritsch on trumped up allegations of homosexuality, Thomas remained an important member of the German General Staff. Nevertheless, it was upon von Fritsch's removal in 1938 that Thomas experienced his first major inner conflict with National Socialism. It is speculated that he stayed aboard from here forward to foment plans for a coup. In 1939, he became head of the Defence Economy and Armament Office in the Oberkommando der Wehrmacht (OKW). He was a member of the board of Kontinentale Öl AG (an oil company whose purpose was to exploit petroleum resources in occupied countries) as well as Reichswerke Hermann Göring, a major iron and steel company.

Thomas, who since 1940 had been a General of Infantry recognized early on that Germany's ability to wage a lengthy war was limited by the state of its economy. When the threat of war with the Western Powers loomed great in the wake of Hitler's bold political moves to secure the Austrian Anschluß, the acquisition of the Sudetenland, and then with the impending Blitzkrieg into Poland awaiting the German General Staff, Thomas produced an extensive report for Hitler assessing the risks. Thomas' analysis was replete with graphics and statistics demonstrating the military-economic superiority of the Western Powers, at which Hitler balked and exclaimed that, "he did not share General Thomas' anxiety over the danger of a world war, especially since he had now got the Soviet Union on his side" (consequent the Molotov-Ribbentrop Pact). Not only was Thomas worried about an attack provoking the British and French but so were Generals von Brauchitsch, Colonel-General Halder, and Quartermaster General von Stülpnagel, yet Hitler refused to countenance any delays or reluctance from his military staff about his plans and more earnestly pushed forward the attack despite their sound arguments otherwise.

During the planning phase of Operation Barbarossa, General Thomas' pragmatic and realistic nature once again gripped him as he thought a full-scale war with the Soviet Union should be delayed until the logistical concerns were remedied. Along said lines, Thomas informed Colonel-General Franz Halder, then Chief of the OKH General Staff, that the attack on the Soviet Union would experience logistical delays due to the fact that Russian railways were of a different gauge than German ones. Thomas also warned Halder of the insufficiency of German transport vehicle tires for the task ahead of them, and most significantly, Thomas revealed to Halder that they (the Germans) only had two months worth of fuel oil and petrol to support the advancing assault. Inexplicably, Halder did not convey this information to Hitler and when Thomas attempted to do this himself, General Field Marshal Wilhelm Keitel stepped in and prevented the report from going any further. Reassurances soon made their way to General Thomas when no less than Reichsminister Hermann Göring told him not to worry about using up Germany's resources since "they would soon be masters of France, Belgium, and the Netherlands", likewise adding that they would plunder all the available resources in the "captured territories".

In November 1942, Thomas resigned from the Defence Economy and Armament Office. Albert Speer and his Armament Ministry, meanwhile, had taken over almost all the expertise relating to armament issues. Of note, during the autumn of 1943 (Paulus surrendered at Stalingrad in January 1943), Hitler asked for a projection over the progress the Germans might expect to make in the near term. Chief of the Operations Staff for the OKW, Colonel-General Alfred Jodl submitted the report to Hitler as commanded, but Hitler became irate when the estimates were given to him, reflecting back sardonically on earlier calculations made by General Thomas who "rated the Soviet war potential as high." 

As a result of the negative assessment about the campaign's future in the East, Hitler forbade any more war studies by the OKW. From what the sources indicate, General Thomas tried unsuccessfully on several occasions to bring the German General Staff and Hitler back to reality about their long-term prospects for success. The pragmatism of Thomas likely contributed to his disillusionment with the regime and its leadership, perhaps leading him to believe that a coup was necessary to stop Germany from being totally annihilated.

Resistance to Hitler 
Through contacts with his former superior Ludwig Beck, as well as with Carl Friedrich Goerdeler and Johannes Popitz, he got to work as early as 1938-39 on the planning for a military coup d'état against Adolf Hitler. 

After the failed attempt on Hitler's life at the Wolf's Lair in East Prussia on 20 July 1944, the coup d'état  plans from 1938–39 were found, leading to Thomas's arrest on 11 October 1944.  After his arrest, he was transferred to the Flossenbürg and Dachau concentration camps. In late April 1945, he was transferred to Tyrol together with about 140 other prominent inmates.  On April 30, after advancing US troops and soldiers from Wichard von Alvensleben's unit, surrounded the village, the SS guards decided to escape. Thomas and the other prisoners were liberated by the Fifth U.S. Army on 5 May 1945. He was freed, moved to Frankfurt am Main, but his imprisonment had broken his health and he died December 29, 1946.

Role in Hunger Plan 

Thomas has been described as someone who at times "toyed with opposition to Hitler's war" but who fundamentally was a "ruthless pragmatist" whose only concern was "Germany's future as a great power." As such, he was deeply involved in the crafting of Nazi policy for the occupied Soviet Union, which in short was designed to exploit the entire resources of the country for the benefit of Germany and the German armed forces, at the expense of the deaths by starvation of millions of people.  This became known as the Hunger Plan. Thomas worked closely with Herbert Backe, the de facto chief of Nazi agriculture, in developing this plan.  In the course of this, on 2 May 1941, Thomas held a high-level meeting to review the strategy. An internal Wehrmacht memorandum prepared by his staff described this policy and acknowledged that "if we take what we need out of the country, there can be no doubt that many millions of people will die of starvation."  This memorandum has been described as:

The historian Christopher Browning writes that on 2 May 1941, the state secretaries of various ministries met with Thomas, and agreed to make it a priority to supply the army with food from Russia, and to ship other essential agricultural products, including grain, to Germany. "In doing so," Thomas's protocol laconically stated, "umpteen million people will doubtless starve to death, if we extract everything necessary for us from the country."

While the memorandum did not estimate how many millions would die, Backe himself stated that the "surplus population" of the Soviet Union was 20 to 30 million.  German policy for the invasion, and instructions to the troops, were deliberately calculated either to kill these 20 to 30 million through starvation, or force them to flee to Siberia.

Notes

References 
 Barnett, Correlli ed. Hitler’s Generals. New York: Grove Press, 2003. 
 Fest, Joachim. Hitler. Orlando, FL.: Mariner Books, 2002. 
 Mitcham, Samuel W., and Gene Mueller. Hitler’s Commanders: Officers of the Wehrmacht, the Luftwaffe, the Kriegsmarine, and the Waffen-SS. Lanham, MD: Rowman & Littlefield Publishers, 2012. 
 Read, Anthony. The Devil's Disciples: Hitler's Inner Circle. New York and London: W.W. Norton & Company, 2003. 
 Rothfels, Hans. The German Opposition to Hitler: An Appraisal. Hinsdale, IL: Henry Regnery Company, 1948.
 Shirer, William L. The Rise and Fall of the Third Reich. New York: Simon & Schuster, 1988.
 Speer, Albert. Inside the Third Reich. New York: Simon & Schuster, 1997.
Die Geschichte der Wirtschaft im Nationalsozialismus. Aus dem Engl. von Yvonne Badal. Siedler, München 2007, . (Neuaufl., Schriftenreihe der Bundeszentrale für politische Bildung. Bd. 663, ; Neuaufl. Pantheon, München 2008, .)
 Wheeler-Bennett, John W. The Nemesis of Power: The German Army in Politics, 1918-1945. New York: St. Martin's Press, 1967.

External links 
 
 Georg Thomas at Gedenkstätte Deutscher Widerstand

1890 births
1946 deaths
People from Forst (Lausitz)
People from the Province of Brandenburg
German Army generals of World War II
Generals of Infantry (Wehrmacht)
Reichswehr personnel
German resistance members
Members of the 20 July plot
Prisoners and detainees of Germany